Kirjasalo is an abandoned village in Vsevolozhsky District of Leningrad Oblast, Russia. It was located between the Volchya and the Smorodinka rivers. Its population was largely composed of Ingrian Finns.

History 
The village was first mentioned on a 17th-century map as Koriasilka.

Kirjasalo has also been spelled as "Кирьясалы" (Kirjasaly) in older Russian maps, at least between 1885 to the 1920s.

From 1919 to 1920, Kirjasalo served as the capital of the short-lived Republic of North-Ingria.

In the mid-1930s the population was for the most part repressed or deported to other areas of the Soviet Union.
During the Continuation War, the Finnish defensive VT-line passed through Kirjasalo.

Demography

References

External links 

Rural localities in Leningrad Oblast
Former populated places in Russia